Six60 are a New Zealand pop rock band formed in Dunedin, Otago in 2008. The band consists of Matiu Walters (lead vocals, guitar), Ji Fraser (lead guitar), Chris Mac (bass guitar), Marlon Gerbes (synthesiser), Hoani Matenga (bass guitar) and Eli Paewai (drums). 

Their self-titled debut album was released on 10 October 2011 on their own label Massive Entertainment. The album was produced and mixed by Tiki Taane and debuted at number one in the New Zealand charts and was certified gold within its first week of release. Their first two singles "Rise Up 2.0" and "Don't Forget Your Roots" reached number one and number two respectively on the RIANZ singles chart and were both certified double and triple platinum. 

In 2018 the band won five Vodafone New Zealand Music Awards and were the most streamed artist by New Zealanders on Spotify. On 23 February 2019, Six60 became the first New Zealand band to play a sold-out concert at the Western Springs Stadium, to a crowd of 50,000 fans. On 24 April 2021, Six60 played the first concert at Auckland's Eden Park Stadium, to a crowd of 50,000 fans. It was the closing of the Six60 Saturdays country-wide tour and the largest concert of 2021.

History
Six60 was formed in Dunedin; the founding members met while attending University of Otago. The band created their name from the street number of the house they lived at in Dunedin, 660 Castle Street. As Ji Fraser said, "That's where it all began. It was the beginning of everything. It was a place that meant so much to us." In July 2021 the band bought 660 Castle Street and created four $10,000 performing arts scholarships at the University of Otago.

Their local following developed from Dunedin to other student hubs around the country such as Auckland, Waikato, Christchurch and Wellington.

Six60's original EP, released in 2008, contained a track called "Someone to Be Around". This track was left off their debut album but remains one of their most popular songs.

Six60 have a quadruple platinum number-one debut album with triple platinum-selling single "Don't Forget Your Roots", two double platinum-selling singles "Only to Be" and "Rise Up", two platinum-selling singles "Forever" and "Special", and one gold-selling single "Lost".

In early March 2013 the band was featured on George FM Breakfast's 'Damn! I Wish I Was Your Cover' series covering Rudimental's "Feel the Love".

In 2014, their song "Run for It" was featured on the trailer of ITV drama series Prey, starring John Simm.

Chris uses a MOOG Voyager / Ernie Ball Musicman Sting Ray Bass guitars. Matiu and Ji both play Fender Strats, Gibson Les Paul electric guitars, and Gibson and Maton acoustic guitars while Marlon uses an MS2000 / Muse VIP / Fender Strat. Eli plays KDrums drums. Matiu's younger brother Niko Walters debuted as a musician in 2019, and has performed as an opening act for Six60.

Discography

Studio albums

Extended plays

Singles

As lead artist

As featured artist

Other charted songs

Six60: Till the Lights Go Out
Six60: Till the Lights Go Out is a 2020 documentary film, directed by Julia Parnell, highlighting the bands humble beginnings to reaching global success.

Awards and nominations

Notes

References

External links

 

APRA Award winners
New Zealand pop rock groups
Māori-language singers